Malcolm Walker may refer to:

Malcolm Walker (American football)
Malcolm Walker (cartoonist)
Malcolm Walker (cricketer)
Sir Malcolm Walker (businessman), co-founder of UK supermarket Iceland Foods Ltd